Niguza habroscopa is a species of moth native to Australia.

References

External links 
 Original 1915 description by Oswald Bertram Lower
 A picture of Niguza habroscopa, from the South Australian Museum

Catocalina
Moths described in 1915
Moths of Australia